The Knoxboro Creek is a  tributary of the Savannah River.  It is located at the boundary between Effingham and Chatham counties in the Greater Savannah Area (state of Georgia).

The Tom Coleman Highway (Interstate 95) goes over Knoxboro Creek, one half of a mile south of the South Carolina-Georgia state border.

See also
 Interstate 95 in Georgia
 Savannah, Georgia
 Savannah River

Footnotes

Rivers of Georgia (U.S. state)
Tributaries of the Savannah River
Rivers of Effingham County, Georgia
Rivers of Chatham County, Georgia